Grochowiska  is a village in the administrative district of Gmina Pińczów, within Pińczów County, Świętokrzyskie Voivodeship, in south-central Poland.

The village is famous for the Battle of Grochowiska in 1863, one of the major engagements of the January Uprising.

References

Villages in Pińczów County
Kielce Governorate
Kielce Voivodeship (1919–1939)